N.O.R.E. y la Familia...Ya Tú Sabe  is the fourth solo studio album by rapper N.O.R.E., released on September 12, 2006. Guest appearances include Ivy Queen, Diddy, Daddy Yankee, Fat Joe, Ja Rule, Pharrell, Chingo Bling, Yaga & Mackie and Nina Sky.

The album marked a change in artistic direction from N.O.R.E.'s previous albums, incorporating elements of Reggaeton and Latino music. It is also the first of his albums to not feature production from The Neptunes, however, Pharrell makes a guest appearance.

Track listing

Credits

Production
 SPK – track 2-4, 10-14
 SPK and Doble A – track 5
 Monserrate – track 7
 Luny Tunes – track 8
 Rafy Mercenario – track 9
 SPK and Echo and Menace – track 10
 Eliel – track 16
 Oz and Rique the Deacon – track 17

Charts

References

2006 albums
Reggaeton albums
Def Jam Recordings albums
Roc-A-Fella Records albums
N.O.R.E. albums
Albums produced by Luny Tunes
Albums produced by Rafy Mercenario